Cairo International Airport  (Maṭār El Qāhira El Dawly) is the principal international airport of Cairo and the largest and busiest airport in Egypt. It serves as the primary hub for Egyptair and Nile Air as well as several other airlines.

It is one of the busiest airports in Africa, in terms of total passengers.

History 
Payne Field was a major Air Transport Command air cargo and passenger hub, connecting westwards through Benghazi Airport (during the war known as Soluch Airfield) to Algiers airport on the North African route to Dakar Airport, in French West Africa.

Other locations that transport routes were flown were RAF Habbaniya, Iraq on the Cairo – Karachi, India route; Lydda Airport, BritishPalestine; Jeddah, Arabia, on the Central African route to Roberts Field, Liberia (1941–1943), and later after the war ended, Athens, Greece and on to destinations in Europe.

When American forces left the base at the end of the war, the Civil Aviation Authority took over the facility and began using it for international civil aviation. In 1963, Cairo International Airport replaced the old Heliopolis Airport, which had been located at the Hike-Step area in the east of Cairo.

The airport is administered by the Egyptian Holding Company for Airports and Air Navigation, which controls the Cairo Airport Company, the Egyptian Airports Company, National Air Navigation Services and Aviation Information Technology, and the Cairo Airport Authority. In 2004, Fraport AG won the management contract to run the airport for eight years, with options to extend the contract twice in one-year increments.

The structural designer and construction supervision firm is ACE Moharram Bakhoum.

Terminals
The terminal facilities include Departure Hall 1, International Hall 3, and Hall 4 for private and non-commercial aircraft services. As part of the recent upgrading and facility improvement scheme, the CAA demolished the old Hall 3, previously used for domestic arrivals and departures, to reconstruct a new hall to be used for international arrivals. Terminal 1 is locally known as the "Old Airport," although its facilities were recently given a complete overhaul and are newer than those of Terminal 2, which is still known as the "New Airport."

Terminal 1
Terminal 1 was originally used by EgyptAir and several Middle Eastern airlines. However, an increasing number of other foreign carriers, such as Air France and KLM transferred operations from Terminal 2 in 2006. In May 2009, EgyptAir moved all its operations to the new Terminal 3 (along with all Star Alliance airlines serving the airport). In March 2010, with the closure of Terminal 2 for major renovation works, all non–Star Alliance airlines serving the airport shifted operations to the terminal.

Departures and arrivals are with all airlines departing from Terminal 1 Hall 1, with the exception of Saudia, which is the sole tenant of Terminal 1 Hall 2 due to the size of their operations (SV accounted for 65% of Terminal 2's traffic in 2009). Most international airlines arrive in Hall 3. Arrival Hall serves international and domestic arrivals.

The CAC has inaugurated the "Airport City Concept" to provide an array of services and entertainment facilities to travelers, airport visitors, as well as the general public. The first phase, a new shopping mall called the 'AirMall' has been built near Terminal 1's International Arrival Hall 3.

As of 2009, the facade of the terminal was being upgraded. A study on reorganizing the departure and arrival halls is ongoing as well as the feasibility study to include contact stands to improve the service and comfort levels to the passengers. Terminal 1 has 12 gates.

Hall 4
Terminal 1, Hall 4 is dedicated to private jet and executive jet services. Even though it is referred to as a 'Hall' under Terminal 1 it is operated independently from the commercial passenger terminal.

Smart Aviation Company has been based at the building since 2007; it moved to a new executive FBO in 2010 adjacent to Hall 4.

Terminal 2

Terminal 2 was inaugurated in 1986 with 7 boarding gates. It primarily served European, Gulf and East Asian airlines. The terminal was closed in April 2010 for complete renovations starting in 2012 and lasting 36 months. The architecture of the building limited the opportunities for further expansion, which necessitated the entire building to be closed for major structural overhaul at an estimated cost of approximately $400 million.

In February 2010, the World Bank's Board of Executive Directors approved a loan amount of $387 million to support the Cairo Airport Development Project (CADP) to overhaul the terminal with national banks providing the rest. The project aimed at increasing the terminal capacity from 3 million to 7.5 million passengers annually. The upgrade included the complete modernization of the 20-year-old facility to reach the same level of service as the new Terminal 3. In August 2011, Turkey's Limak Holding won the tender for modernizing the terminal.

After several project delays, the renovated terminal had its soft opening on 28 September 2016 with a capacity of 7.5 million passengers bringing the airport's total passenger capacity to 30 million passengers annually. The new terminal has 14 gates and an additional 5 remote stands.

During February 2017, Saudi Arabian Airlines launched its first international "Al-Fursan lounge" at Cairo International Airport Terminal 2. The 1,500 square-meter lounge can accommodate 300 people at a time.

The renovated terminal is operating jointly with Terminal 3 as one integrated terminal via an air bridge, thus, reinforcing the role of Cairo International Airport as a regional hub.

Terminal 3

Given projected growth, and the limited ability to expand Terminal 2, the Egyptian Ministry of Civil Aviation began construction of Terminal 3 in 2004. The terminal was officially inaugurated on 18 December 2008 and opened for commercial operations on 27 April 2009. The facility is twice as large as the current two terminal buildings combined, with the capacity to handle 11 million passengers annually (6 million international and 5 million domestic) once the first phase is completed. It is adjacent to Terminal 2, and the two terminals are initially connected by a bridge.

With its hub at the airport, EgyptAir's operations were overhauled with the full transfer of its operations (international and domestic) into the new terminal between 27 April and 15 June 2009. To implement the Star Alliance "Move Under One Roof" concept, all Alliance members serving the airport were relocated to the terminal by the first of August 2009.

The new terminal includes:
 Two piers of extendable capacity and gates facilities serving domestic and international traffic on contact and remote stands. The main building and the piers are connected by concourses. Two of the gates are equipped to handle Airbus A380 aircraft. Provisions for a third pier are in the planning stages.
 Terminal 3 has 23 gates (2 gates for the A380), 6 check-in islands consisting of 110 check-in counters (plus 10 mobile counters and 10 CUSS kiosks), 76 immigration counters (plus 5 biometric gates), 52 contact and remote aircraft parking stands (5 with multiple uses), 425 FIDS, 15 public information points, 7 baggage carousels, 63 elevators, 50 moving walkways and 51 escalators.
 Retail space covers more than 5,000m2 (4.034m2 occupied by EgyptAir Tourism & Duty Free Shops).
International food court with Oriental, Asian and Western food (incl. Burger King, Hippopotamus, Upper Crust).
Landside roads including bridges and flyover serving the traffic to and from the terminal building, surface car park areas (multi-story parking garage capable of holding more than 3,000 cars), a new access road connecting the airport with the Autostrad road (Cairo ring road) and upgrading the access roads.

Seasonal flight terminal
On 20 September 2011, Prime Minister Sharaf inaugurated the new Seasonal Flights Terminal (ST), located west of Terminal 3. During the start-up phase EgyptAir operates its daily flight to Medina from the new Terminal. All Hajj traffic of EgyptAir will move to the ST while Saudia's Hajj flights will still operate from Terminal 1.

The terminal has an annual capacity of 3.2 million passengers with 27 check-in counters and 7 gates with a common gate and single security concept, the first in Cairo. It is designed to handle 1,200 passengers per hour. Passengers will be bussed to remote aircraft stands around Terminal 3. Its purpose is to ease operational strains on the existing terminals during pilgrim seasons.

Facilities

Overview

The airport has four terminals, the third (and largest) opened on 27 April 2009 and the Seasonal Flights Terminal opened on 20 September 2011. Terminal 2 was closed in April 2010 for major renovation works and was reopened on 28 September 2016. A third parallel runway replaced the crossing runway in 2010.

Terminal Transfer
The MiniMetro people mover links Terminal 1, the AirMall, the multi-storey car park and Terminals 2 and 3. The main station is located between Terminals 2 and 3 and is an integral part of the bridge connecting the two terminals. An air-cushioned  system with top speed  was designed and constructed by Leitner-Poma.

Airport Hotel
A luxury 350-room five-star Le Méridien hotel opened in front of Terminal 3 in December 2013. The hotel is linked to the terminal by a  skyway that is also equipped with a moving walkway.

Future developments

With the national carrier, EgyptAir, and the Egyptian authorities planning to develop the airport as a hub for the Middle East and Africa, the airport facilities are in constant development.

Several projects are underway, including:
 Construction of a multi-story car park located near Terminal 3.
 Continued upgrade of the land-side façade of Terminal 1.
 The Cairo Cargo City (CCC) will provide facilities to support the growth in cargo traffic through the airport.
 Development of real estate and the Oasis Project, which entails a business park with company headquarters and regional offices.
 Construction of 'Aerocity''', a family leisure park to be built within the airport's investment zone. The first phase will consist of the building of a business center, and the second, of an entertainment park following the guidelines of Disney World, in the United States. There will also be parks, an artificial lake, game courts, a water park, 18 cinemas, and several restaurants. This will be a new feature of Cairo Airport and forms part of the long-term development and modernization plan.

 Statistics 

The sharp decline in 2020 was caused by the COVID-19 pandemic worldwide and in Egypt.

Airlines and destinations

Passenger

Cargo

Ground transport

Limousines and shuttle buses
There are several ways to leave Cairo airport upon arrival. The most convenient way is by one of the numerous "limousine services". Pick-up points are in front of the terminals (curb side). The prices are fixed depending on the destination and the car category, but different providers may charge wildly different prices. Category A are luxury limousines (e.g. Mercedes-Benz E-Class), Category B are Micro Buses for up to seven passengers, Category C are midsized cars (e.g. Mitsubishi Lancer) and new Category D are London Taxis.

Public transport

A shuttle bus connects with all the passenger terminals and finally stops at the Cairo Airport Bus Terminal where public buses heading to other destinations in Cairo and connect frequently to major transportation hubs like Abbasia and Tahrir Square/Abdel-Moniem Riad bus terminus.

However, there were efforts by Transport for Cairo (TFC) to map the major bus routes and metro lines in Cairo. Having this map in hand is useful.

Also, scheduling and route information of both the public Cairo Transportation Authority (CTA) and Mwasalat Mirs (MM) buses are now readily available on Google Transit and can be accessed using the Google Maps app and website.

Persons carrying cabin-sized pieces of luggage can use most of the public buses in Cairo without having to pay for an extra ticket (unless they block the seat next to them with the bag, in which case they might be asked to pay for another ticket ranging from 5 to 10 LE). There were plans to connect the Line 3 of the Cairo Metro to the airport however, these plans have been put on hold. The nearest metro stations are Heliopolis square and Adly Mansour Interchange station.

Transit Map for Cairo Metro and Mwasalat Misr buses, provided by Transport for Cairo. Note that this map doesn't include the latest Cairo Metro expansions, as Line 3 now reaches Heliopolis Sq, Huckstep/AlHikestep and Adly Mansor Interchange Stations.

Taxi
With the exception of the so-called (and increasingly scarce) "Black and White" cabs, all regular Cairo taxis (colloquially known as the White taxi) are equipped with digital taxi meters. Taxi drivers in Cairo are legally required to switch on their Taxi meters the moment they pick up a new client (See video on Mada Masr). However, some taxi drivers will try to either manipulate how the meter counts the distance driven (by electronically tampering with their meters) or will remove the meter and force the customer to bargain for a price.

Ride Sharing
An affordable and reliable form of private transport readily available in Cairo are the popular ride-sharing mobile phone app based services such as Uber and Careem, which both accepts cash and card payments.

Car Rental
Several international car rental providers operate out of Cairo International Airport (CAI) and have offices both in Terminals 3 and 1.

Car
The airport can be reached via Oroba Road from Heliopolis or via the new road, connecting Terminal 3 with the Cairo Ring Road and Suez Road interchange. The toll for driving into the airport grounds range from 10 to 20 EGP depending on the type of the vehicle.

Note: Cairo-Suez road is part of the Arab Mashreq International Road Network, designated as the Motorway 50/M50. It connects Cairo to Suez, South Sinai through the Ahmed Hamdi Tunnel under the Suez Canal, then to Israel via the Taba Border Crossing, Jordan via the Wadi Araba Crossing, to Saudi Arabia via Durra Border Crossing, and then finally into Iraq via the Arar border crossing where the road ends in the capital, Baghdad. To bypass crossing through the Taba Border Crossing, where an entry visa to Israel may be required, the majority of the intra-Arab road traffic -including cargo and trucking- uses the Nuweiba – Aqaba ferries.

Accidents and incidents

 On 20 February 1956, a "Transports Aériens Intercontinentaux" Douglas DC-6B on a scheduled Saigon-Karachi-Cairo-Paris flight crashed on approach to Cairo airport, killing 52 of the 63 people on board.
 On 19 March 1965, Vickers Viscount YI-ACU of Iraqi Airways was damaged beyond economic repair when it ran into a number of lamp standards after a hydraulic system failure.
 On 20 May 1965, Pakistan International Airlines Flight 705, a Boeing 720-040B, crashed on approach to Runway 34, killing 121.
 On 18 March 1966, United Arab Airlines Flight 749 crashed while attempting to land at Cairo International Airport. All 30 passengers and crew on board were killed.
 On 15 January 1968, Douglas DC-3 SU-AJG of United Arab Airlines departed on an international scheduled cargo flight to Beirut when the crew decided to return due to icing. The aircraft subsequently broke up in mid-air and crashed at Zefta, killing all four people on board. The cargo shifting in flight and the aircraft being  overloaded may have contributed to the accident.
 On 6 September 1970, Pan Am Flight 93, which was flying to New York City from Amsterdam, was hijacked and landed in Cairo after refueling and picking up another hijacker in Beirut. The Boeing 747–100 was blown up after everyone got out. The hijackers were arrested later.
 After more than forty years, an EgyptAir plane (EgyptAir Flight 667) caught fire while parked at the terminal just before it's scheduled flight to Saudi Arabia. Everyone on board was able to quickly get off the plane.

Accolades
 2010 – One of the three most improved airports by Skytrax World Airport Awards
 2011 – Second Best Airport in Africa'' of the Airport Service Quality Awards by Airports Council International

See also 
List of airports in Egypt

References

External links

 
 Live flight tracking at FlightAware
 
 

1940s establishments in Egypt
Transport in Cairo
Airports in Egypt
World War II airfields in Egypt
Airfields of the United States Army Air Forces Air Transport Command in North Africa
Airfields of the United States Army Air Forces in Egypt